The University Observer is a broadsheet newspaper distributed throughout the campus of University College Dublin, Ireland, once every three weeks. 

Launched in 1994 by University College Dublin Students' Union, the newspaper was an immediate successor to the publication Students' Union News. The University Observer was founded by dual editors Pat Leahy (who later joined The Irish Times) and Dara Ó Briain (later a broadcaster and comedian). Other former editors include a number of Irish journalists who went on to other publications, including Killian Woods (later of the Business Post), Samantha Libreri (of RTÉ News), and Gavan Reilly (of Virgin Media Television and Newstalk).

The University Observer has received several awards, including five "newspaper of the year" awards at Ireland's National Student Media Awards.

References

External links

University College Dublin
Student newspapers published in the Republic of Ireland
1994 establishments in Ireland
Publications established in 1994